Henry Worsley is the name of:

Sir Henry Worsley, 2nd Baronet (1613–1666), English politician
Henry Worsley (ambassador) (1672–1740), British Ambassador to Portugal and Governor of Barbados
Sir Henry Worsley-Holmes, 8th Baronet (1756–1811), of the Worsley baronets
Henry Worsley (British Army officer) (1783–1820), lieutenant-colonel
Henry Worsley (major-general) (1768–1841), major-general
Henry Worsley-Taylor (1847–1924), 1st Baronet of the Worsley-Taylor baronets
Henry Worsley (explorer) (1960–2016), British Army officer and Antarctic adventurer